Carl Wilhelm August Tham (22 July 1812  – 12 July 1873) was a Swedish author, historian and geographer.

Carl Wilhelm August Tham was born in Forsvik, Sweden. He was the son of Vollrath Tham and Ulrika Beata Vult von Steijern.

He studied at Uppsala University and then worked as a teacher in Strängnäs. In 1850, Tham taught mathematics and physical geography at the Royal Swedish Academy of War Sciences.

Works 

 Vaticinorum Jesaiae caput V / Suethice versum, 1833
 Franska revolutionens historia i sammandrag efter A. Thiers, såsom inledning till konsulatets och kejsardömets historia, 1845
 Bidrag till svenska riksdagarnes och regeringsformens historia från midten af sjuttonde århundradet, 1845-1848
 Riksdagarne 1660 i Göteborg och Stockholm, 1845
 Beskrifning öfver Örebro län, 1849
 Beskrifning öfver Westerås län, 1849
 Beskrifning öfver Upsala län, 1850
 Beskrifning öfver Stockholms län, 1850
 Beskrifning öfver Nyköpings län, 1852
 Beskrifning öfver Linköpings län, 1854-1855
 Bidrag till Svenska Riksdagarnes Historia 1626-1629, 1855
 medförfattare till Nils Wilhelm Almroth, De europeiska myntsorterna, jemte en del amerikanska och asiatiska. Afbildning och beskrifning af alla nu curserande guld- och silfvermynt med uppgift på deras vigt, deras halt samt deras penninge- och metallvärde, 1856
 Konung Gustaf III och rikets ständer vid 1789 års riksdag, 1866
 Grunddrag till svensk och allmän statskunskap, 1868
 Grunddrag till allmän historia från 1492, 1871

References 

1812 births
1873 deaths
19th-century Swedish writers
19th-century male writers
Swedish-language writers
19th-century Swedish historians
Knights of the Order of the Polar Star
Wilhelm